The Black Beer Festival is a craft beer festival in Valdivia, Southern Chile. The festival was originally organised in the first week of July 2010 by a consortium of the beer companies Calle Calle, Valbier, Cuello Negro and KM 858. The first edition edition consisted of a business meeting in Hotel Dreams Valdivia followed by a public event at the Isla Teja Campus of the Austral University of Chile. Following its first edition the festival has been held in Parque SAVAL. The festival is sponsored by the National Tourist Service (SERNATUR). The festival has been variously held the first, second or third week of July each year.

References

Beer festivals in Chile
Recurring events established in 2010
Tourist attractions in Los Ríos Region
Winter events in Chile
Festivals established in 2010